The 2010–11 Atlantic Coast Conference men's basketball season was the 58th season for the league.

Preseason
The AP preseason All-American team was named on November 1.  Duke's Kyle Singler was the leading vote-getter with 62 of a possible 65 votes. North Carolina forward Harrison Barnes received 17 votes and became the first freshman in history to be named to the preseason team.

Records
Duke coach Mike Krzyzewski won his 800th game at Duke on November 24, making him the fifth ever coach to reach that milestone at one school. Kyle Singler and Virginia Tech guard Malcolm Delaney each passed the 2,000 point mark for their careers.

Rankings
Duke was the preseason #1 in the AP and ESPN/USA Today Coaches Polls while North Carolina was ranked #9 and Virginia Tech was #23.
However, Duke later dropped to #3 and then #5, but eventually regained the #1 ranking for one week before dropping again to #4.
North Carolina dropped out of the rankings after week 3 and Virginia Tech dropped out after week 2 leaving Duke as the only ACC school in the top 25 until week 11 when Florida State spent one week at #22 before dropping back out of the rankings.
North Carolina reappeared at #24 in week 12 and has since moved up to #6.

Season awards
Player of the Year

Nolan Smith

Rookie of the Year
Harrison Barnes

Coach of the Year
Roy Williams

Defensive Player of the Year
John Henson

All-Atlantic Coast Conference.

First Team
Nolan Smith1 – Duke
Jordan Williams – Maryland
Malcolm Delaney – Virginia Tech
Kyle Singler – Duke
Reggie Jackson – Boston College
1 – Denotes unanimous selection
Second Team
Tyler Zeller – North Carolina
John Henson – North Carolina
Harrison Barnes – North Carolina
Iman Shumpert – Georgia Tech
Jeff Allen – Virginia Tech
Third Team
Chris Singleton – Florida State
Demontez Stitt – Clemson
Joe Trapani – Boston College
Malcolm Grant – Miami
Kendall Marshall – North Carolina

All-ACC Freshman team
Harrison Barnes1 – North Carolina
Travis McKie – Wake Forest
Kendall Marshall – North Carolina
Terrell Stoglin – Maryland
C. J. Leslie – N.C. State
1 – Denotes unanimous selection

All-ACC Defensive team
John Henson1 – North Carolina
Chris Singleton – Florida State
Iman Shumpert – Georgia Tech
Nolan Smith – Duke
Jerai Grant – Clemson
1 – Denotes unanimous selection

References